Star Reach is a real-time strategy video game for DOS released by Interplay in 1994. It was published as Space Federation in Europe.

Plot
The purpose of the game is to lead one of seven species (humans and six other alien species) in a race to rule the universe, one galaxy at a time.

Gameplay

Reception
A reviewer for Next Generation commented that though Star Reach "attempts to bring the best elements of arcade play and strategy together", it lacks any innovative or unique feature aside from the world building elements. He further criticized that the two-player mode "usually boil[s] down to who hits whom first", and gave the game two out of five stars.

References

DOS games
DOS-only games
1994 video games
Interplay Entertainment games
Real-time strategy video games
Video games scored by Neil Voss
Video games set in outer space
Video games developed in the United States